Schistogyne is a genus of flowering plants in the family Apocynaceae, first described as a genus in 1810. It is native to South America.

Species

formerly included
 moved to other genera (Calostigma, Oxypetalum)
 S. attenuata now  Oxypetalum attenuatum
 S. multiflora now  Calostigma multiflorum
 S. oxypetaloides now  Oxypetalum attenuatum

References

Apocynaceae genera
Asclepiadoideae